The Pact of Cartagena was an exchange of notes that took place at Cartagena on 16 May 1907 between France, Great Britain, and Spain. The parties declared their intention to preserve the status quo in the western Mediterranean and in the Atlantic, especially their insular and coastal possessions. The pact aligned Spain with the Anglo-French entente cordiale against Germany's ambitions in Morocco, where both Spain and France had mutually recognised (and British-recognised) spheres of influence.

During the First World War, the Pact was cited by those Spanish politicians who favoured closer ties with, or even intervention on the side of, the Entente. On 21 April 1915, the leading conservative politician in Spain, Antonio Maura, made a public statement that:
Spain has the position in northern Africa and in the western Mediterranean which was granted to her by that agreement, she has a community of interests with England and France and the reciprocal promise of maintaining and working in favor of this community, and of this status quo[,] was given by the powers concerned.

Texts of notes

Aftermath 

After the First Moroccan Crisis (which was decided at the Algeciras Conference in 1906) strengthened Spain's ties with Britain and France and public support for rearmament increased afterwards, the Spanish government reached an agreement with those two powers. for a mutual defense plan, which are the aforementioned Cartagena Agreements of 1907. In exchange for British and French support for the defense of Spain, the Spanish fleet would support the French Navy in case of war with the Triple Alliance against the combined fleets of the Kingdom of Italy and Austria-Hungary in the Mediterranean Sea since the Royal Navy should focus on the North Sea against the Imperial German Navy; and the French fleet alone could not contain the Italian and Austro-Hungarian fleets together and it was necessary for France to transport its colonial troops from North Africa to the European continent.

With the transfer of technology from the United Kingdom, the Spanish government was able to build the España-class battleship and designed the Reina Victoria Eugenia-class battleship that were canceled due to the start of the First World War.

Later, when the Great War broke out in 1914, the Italian government declared its neutrality. As the Pact of Cartagena was signed in part in the face of the danger of the combined strength of the Austro-Hungarian and Italian navies, the Spanish government had political room to also declare its neutrality in the conflict. Spain remained neutral throughout the war, while Italy later joined the Entente

See also 
 International relations (1814–1919)
 Causes of World War I
 Diplomatic history of World War I

Notes

Sources

 

1907 in France
1907 in Spain
1907 in the United Kingdom
France–Spain relations
History of Cartagena, Spain
Spain–United Kingdom relations
Treaties concluded in 1907
Treaties of Spain under the Restoration
Treaties of the French Third Republic
Treaties of the United Kingdom (1801–1922)